Water retention can refer to:

Water retention (medicine), an abnormal accumulation of fluid in the circulatory system or within the tissues or cavities of the body
Edema, an abnormal accumulation of fluid beneath the skin, or in one or more cavities of the body
Premenstrual water retention, a common phenomenon associated with the menstrual cycle
Water retention curve, relationship between soil water content and water pressure head
Water retention on mathematical surfaces, topographic surfaces with basins